Richard Munday (c.1685-1739) was a prominent colonial American architect and builder in Newport, Rhode Island.

Munday built several notable public buildings in Newport between 1720 and 1739 helping to modernize the city.  Christopher Wren's church of St. James at Piccadilly in London, England, and Old North Church in Boston, are believed to have greatly influenced Munday's baroque style. Munday also built many Georgian houses in Newport and was a parishioner at Trinity Church. Few details about his life have survived.

Works by Munday
Old Colony House, 1739, a U.S. National Historic Landmark (NHL)
Sabbatarian Meeting House (currently home of the Newport Historical Society), 1729 
Trinity Church, Newport, 1725, also an NHL
Daniel Ayrault house, Newport, 1739-40 (built with Benjamin Wyatt)
Malbone Castle and Estate, 1739-40 (resembled Colony House, destroyed in 1766 fire)
Malbone town house, 1729 (demolished)
Jahleel Brent House, (possible contributor)
John Gidley House, (possible contributor)

External links and references
James D. Kornwolf, Georgiana Wallis Kornwolf, Architecture and Town Planning in Colonial North America, (JHU Press, 2002), pg. 1026 
Preservation Society pictures of Munday's works
Antoinette F. Downing, Early Homes of Rhode Island (Richmond, VA: Gt: 1937) 
A. F. Downing & V.J.Scully, The Architectural Heritage of Newport Rhode Island 1640-1915 (NY: Bramhill, 1967) 
Henry Russell Hitchcock, Rhode Island Architecture, (Providence: Mus. Pres., 1939)

1685 births
1739 deaths
Architects from Newport, Rhode Island